Glossopetalon clokeyi, known as Clokey's greasebush is a species of flowering plant native to western North America.

Distribution and habitat
Clokey's greasebush is a rare species, endemic to the Spring Mountains in Clark County, Nevada. It is threatened by recreational climbing activities on the steep limestone cliffs where it occurs.

References

Crossosomataceae
Flora of North America